Piero Tellini (16 January 1917 – 22 June 1985) was an Italian screenwriter and film director.
 
Born in Florence, the son of the soprano Ines Alfani(the Soprano Opera singer for 10 years with Arturo Toscanini), Tellini graduated at the Centro Sperimentale di Cinematografia in Rome and in 1938 he entered the cinema industry as an assistant director. He later dedicated to the activity of screenwriter, contributing to the success of the Italian neorealism and notably collaborating with Luigi Zampa, Alberto Lattuada, Michelangelo Antonioni, Alessandro Blasetti and  Eduardo De Filippo.

In 1947 Tellini won the Nastro d'Argento for the script of Zampa's To Live in Peace, while in 1952 he was awarded the Best Screenplay Award at the Cannes Film Festival for Mario Monicelli's and Steno's Cops and Robbers. Starting from 1954 he was also active as a film director.

He was first married to actress Liliana Tellini.

Selected filmography
 Captain Fracasse (1940)
 The Mask of Cesare Borgia (1941)
 To Live in Peace (1947)
 Alarm Bells (1949)
 Nel blu dipinto di blu (1959)

References

External links 
 

1917 births
1985 deaths
Italian film directors
20th-century Italian screenwriters
Italian male screenwriters
Film people from Florence
Centro Sperimentale di Cinematografia alumni
Nastro d'Argento winners
20th-century Italian male writers
Cannes Film Festival Award for Best Screenplay winners